The West Coast Eagles are an Australian rules football team based in Perth, Western Australia. Their 2022 season is their 36th season in the Australian Football League (AFL), their ninth season with Adam Simpson as coach, and their third season with Luke Shuey as captain. They finished the season with 2 wins & 20 losses, placing them 17th on the ladder.

Background 

The West Coast Eagles are an Australian rules football team based in Perth, Western Australia, that competes in the Australian Football League (AFL). They ended the 2021 home-and-away season ninth on the ladder, causing them to miss finals.

In the off-season, Luke Shuey was voted captain for the third year in a row. Jeremy McGovern and Nic Naitanui were voted to become vice captains for the 2022 season. Tom Barrass, Liam Duggan and Oscar Allen were voted in as the remaining players for the leadership group. Josh Kennedy was the only person to leave the leadership group, stepping down as 2022 will likely be his last season. Adam Simpson was head coach for a ninth season.

Playing list

Changes

Statistics

Season summary 
The fixture for the 2022 season was revealed in December 2021, with each team scheduled to play 22 matches and have a mid-season bye. Only the first nine rounds had times and dates set for the matches, with the remaining dates released as the season progressed.

Rounds 1–12 
West Coast's first match was against the Gold Coast Suns at Optus Stadium. This match saw the AFL debut of Brady Hough, and the West Coast debut of Sam Petrevski-Seton, Patrick Naish, and Hugh Dixon. Willie Rioli also played his first game since 2019, having served a two-year suspension for tampering with urine tests. West Coast lost the match 80–107, making this the first time that the Eagles had lost to the Suns at home. Tom Barrass, who was celebrating his 100th AFL game, kicked his first ever goal.

Results

Ladder

WAFL team

References 

West Coast Eagles seasons
West Coast Eagles